George Grundy Dunn (December 20, 1812 – September 4, 1857) was an American lawyer and politician who served one term as a U.S. Representative from Indiana from 1847 to 1849 and another term from 1855 to 1857.

Early life and education
George Grundy Dunn was born in Washington County, Kentucky on December 20, 1812, to Samuel and Elizabeth Grundy Dunn. In 1823, his family moved to Monroe County, Indiana. He completed preparatory studies and attended Indiana Seminary which is now known as Indiana University in Bloomington. Due to a dispute with a professor, Dunn left the school in his third year.

Career
In 1833, Dunn moved to Switzerland County, Indiana to teach school. He later moved to Bedford, Indiana to study law. 
Dunn was admitted to the bar in 1835 and partnered with Richard W. Thompson to practice law in Bedford. In 1842, he became the prosecuting attorney of Lawrence County, Indiana.

Dunn served in several political offices. He was well known for his passionate oratory skills. Dunn was elected as a Whig to the Thirtieth Congress (March 4, 1847 – March 3, 1849).
He was an unsuccessful candidate for reelection in 1848.
Dunn served in the Indiana Senate from 1850 until 1852, when he resigned to oversee his law practice.

An opponent of slavery, Dunn was drawn back into politics after the passage of the Kansas-Nebraska Act which expanded slavery. Dunn was elected as an Indiana People's Party candidate to the Thirty-fourth Congress (March 4, 1855 – March 3, 1857). He was in poor health for much of his term and did not seek renomination in 1856.

Marriage and family
In 1841, Dunn married Julia Fell. They had four children: Moses Fell Dunn (1842-1915), Samuel Dunn (1844-1845), Julia M Dunn (1845-1845), and George Grundy Dunn (1846-1891).

Death
Dunn died in Bedford, Indiana, on September 4, 1857. He was interred in Green Hill Cemetery in Bedford.

References

External links
 Archives Online at Indiana University: Dunn family collection, 1851-1974, bulk 1851-1955
 Archives Online at Indiana University: Dunn mss., 1834-1850
Archives Online at Indiana University: Dunn mss. II, 1831-1864

1812 births
1857 deaths
People from Washington County, Kentucky
Whig Party members of the United States House of Representatives from Indiana
Opposition Party members of the United States House of Representatives from Indiana
Indiana state senators
People from Monroe County, Indiana
People from Bedford, Indiana
19th-century American politicians
Burials in Indiana